Mehmet Aslantuğ (born 25 September 1961) is a Turkish actor, director, producer, and screenwriter of Circassian origin. He has received a Golden Boll Award, a Golden Objective Award, three Golden Orange Awards, and four Golden Butterfly Awards.

Early life and career
Aslantuğ was born in 1961 to Circassian parents from Turkey. He has appeared in more than 30 films and television shows since 1981. He starred in Akrebin Yolculuğu, which was screened in the Un Certain Regard section at the 1997 Cannes Film Festival.

In April 2011, it was announced Aslantuğ would portray the role of Çerkez Ethem in an upcoming Mohy Quandour film.

Filmography

Film

Television

Selected awards and nominations

References

External links

1961 births
Living people
Turkish male film actors
Turkish film directors
Turkish film producers
Turkish male screenwriters
Turkish male television actors
Turkish people of Circassian descent
Turkish people of Ubykh descent
20th-century Turkish screenwriters
21st-century Turkish screenwriters
Best Actor Golden Orange Award winners
Best Actor Golden Boll Award winners
Golden Butterfly Award winners